The Oceania Confederation of Roller Sports (OCRS) is the main roller skating organization of Australia and other Oceanic countries. The OCRS is part of the International Roller Sports Federation, or FIRS.  Varieties of skating governed by the OCRS include:
Inline Downhill
Roller hockey
Inline hockey
Speedskating

External links
Describes organization: FIRS Organizational chart

Roll
Roller skating organizations